"Haven't Got Time for the Pain" is a song written by Carly Simon and Jacob Brackman that was first released on Simon's 1974 album Hotcakes.  It was also released as a single, reaching No. 14 on the Billboard Hot 100 and No. 2 on the Billboard Adult Contemporary chart.

Lyrics and music
The song, composed in the key of G major, contains a ii-V-I progression common in R&B and jazz. AllMusic critic Joe Viglione described "Haven't Got Time for the Pain" as sounding like a sequel to "The Right Thing to Do," from Simon's previous album No Secrets from 1972.  The lyrics state that after a new, wonderful person has entered  the singer's life, she no longer has time or reason for suffering over past lovers lost.  According to author Sheila Weller, the lyrics reflect Simon's life at the time – she has no more use for "self-obsession" or "existential angst."  Viglione describes Simon's vocals as being "perfectly in tune," and Weller describes the passion expressed by her "bleating voice" as undercutting the "vow of emotional peace" in the lyrics, which according to Weller "gives the song its edge."  Instrumentation includes piano, played by Simon herself, drums and string instruments, plus acoustic guitar played by Simon's then-husband James Taylor. Viglione praises producer Richard Perry for "very cleverly accentuating Simon's emotions" by using classical instruments in the song.

Simon was pregnant with her first child, Sally, during the recording sessions. The pregnancy prevented her from singing the highest notes of "Haven't Got Time for the Pain", so these notes were covered by a backing singer who sounded similar to Simon. The album was released with this uncredited replacement vocal, but after Sally was born in early 1974, Simon re-recorded the part, singing it herself for the 7-inch single release. The string-and-percussion outro at the end of the song was composed by cellist Paul Buckmaster and drummer Ralph MacDonald. Weller describes the string interlude as "operatic."

Reception
Rolling Stone critic Jon Landau described "Haven't Got Time for the Pain" as Simon's "best single to date"; this following such hit singles as "Anticipation" and "You're So Vain."  Billboard described it as a "pretty ballad" that is somewhat similar to some of her earlier songs and praised Simon's vocal performance.  Cash Box said that "Carly's vocals are as bright and sensitive as ever and work this ballad perfectly" and that "Richard Perry’s usual incredible production touch adds the necessary depth and makes this one of Carly’s most exciting single outings to date." Record World called it "a high-flyin' solo ballad, kept aloft by winds of melodic, orchestral and tempo changes."  Viglione describes it as "one of the classiest as well as one of the simplest" of the many successful singles released by female vocalists in 1974.  Music critic Robert Christgau called "Haven't Got Time for the Pain" "the most insidious let's-write-God-a-love-song to date".  Author Bruce Pollock described it as a "yuppie credo."

"Haven't Got Time for the Pain" has been included on several Carly Simon compilation albums, including The Best of Carly Simon in 1975, Clouds in My Coffee in 1995, The Very Best of Carly Simon: Nobody Does It Better in 1999, Anthology in 2002, Reflections: Carly Simon's Greatest Hits and Carly Simon Collector's Edition in 2009.

In popular culture
The song was heard in commercials for the ibuprofen brand Medipren in the late 1980s.

Track listing
7" single
 "Haven't Got Time For The Pain" – 3:50
 "Mind On My Man" – 2:57

Charts

Weekly charts

Year-end charts

Personnel
Carly Simon – vocals, piano
James Taylor – acoustic lead guitar
Jimmy Ryan – acoustic rhythm guitar
 Klaus Voormann – bass guitar
 Jim Keltner – drums
 Lani Groves – backing vocals
 Carl Hall – backing vocals
 Tasha Thomas – backing vocals
 Ralph MacDonald – percussion
 Paul Buckmaster – string and woodwind arrangements, conductor
 Richard Perry – producer

References

External links
Carly Simon's Official Website

1974 songs
1974 singles
Carly Simon songs
Songs written by Carly Simon
Songs written by Jacob Brackman
Song recordings produced by Richard Perry
Elektra Records singles